No Place in Heaven is the fourth studio album by British singer-songwriter Mika, released on 15 June 2015 via Republic Records (Casablanca).

Background and recording
After his first two records were described as campy affairs, Mika's third release The Origin of Love marked a drastic shift in musical style for the songwriter. No Place in Heaven continues that evolution. Mika described the recording process in an interview with Out Magazine: "I formed a little design studio with my sister and started drawing again like we used to in the kitchen of my mother's house. I was basically liberating myself and making my brain work very hard—scaring myself with challenges. As a result, the album is direct, low-down, open, candid, playful, yet a mature pop album which takes its inspiration from '60s pop music, very much the way my first album did."

Shortly after the record was officially confirmed, the songs "Talk About You" and "Last Party" were released. The latter song is an homage to late Queen frontman Freddie Mercury.

Singles
"Talk About You" was released as the album's lead single. It was released to digital retailers on 31 March and the music video premiered on 27 April 2015.

Music videos for "Last Party," "Good Guys" and "Staring at the Sun" were released on 8 April, 25 May and 31 July respectively.

The video for "Last Party" featured Mika singing directly into the camera and was filmed in black and white by famed fashion photographer Peter Lindbergh.

The song "Hurts" was remixed into an electro-pop version and appears on the November 2015 French reissue of No Place In Heaven as the 17th track, and on the Italian reissue as the 18th track. This version was released in Italy as a single first played on radio on 29 January 2016. It was also featured in the 2016 Italian film Un Bacio. A music video featuring Mika and three of the film's stars was released in February 2016. Both versions of the song appear on the film's soundtrack release.

Deluxe edition
On 13 November 2015 the album was re-released in the form of a double-disc deluxe edition, containing a number of bonus tracks on Disc 1 as well as a full-length orchestral bonus disc, which includes a performance by MIKA with L'Orchestre Symphonique De Montreal.

This version of the album has currently only been released in France, Canada and Italy. The French edition uses the original French track listing of the album, as well as containing five bonus tracks, including a remix of "Hurts", three new songs (including French-language track "Je Chante"), and a French version of "Staring at the Sun".

The Italian edition uses the original English track listing of the album, as well as containing six bonus tracks, including "Boum Boum Boum" (which had not previously been released in the country), the "Hurts" remix, three new songs (including Italian-language track "Center of Gravity"), a bonus Italian version of one of the new songs as well as "Porcelain".

Commercial performance
In the United Kingdom, the album debuted at number 19, and lasted three weeks on the charts with sales of 15,000, improving on the sales of The Origin of Love. It also debuted at number six in Canada and number 117 in the United States. The album had more success in France, where it debuted and peaked at number two, lasting 54 weeks on the charts with more than 140,000 sales, earning a platinum award, and in Italy, where it debuted at number 3 and lasted 53 weeks with more than 55,000 sales, also earning a platinum award there.

The album was also a success in other parts of Europe, including in Switzerland, where it reached number four, in Wallonia, where it reached number three and in Flanders, where it reached number 9. The album also charted in Spain, Netherlands, Austria, Germany, Croatia, Ireland, the Czech Republic, Lithuania and Latvia. The album peaked at number 33 in Japan and debuted at number 10 in South Korea.

Track listing

Notes
 – additional production

Charts

Weekly charts

Year-end charts

L'Orchestre Symphonique de Montreal

The deluxe special edition disc was made available and charted separately in Canada.

Certifications

References

2015 albums
Mika (singer) albums